Alice Dease (14 February 1874  – 27 October 1949) was an Irish writer and folklorist.

Biography
Born Alice Mary Frances Dease 14 February 1874, she was the tenth and youngest daughter of Irish landowners, James Arthur Dease and Charlotte Jerningham, of Turbotston in County Westmeath. She also had two older brothers. She married Philip Charles Chichester in 1915. Before her marriage she had written a number of works and she wrote about local folklore and had articles and stories published through the Catholic Truth Society. She died a widow in County Dublin in 1949.

Bibliography
 Good Women of Erin (1905)
 The Beckoning of the Wand: Sketches of a Lesser Known Ireland (1908) 
 The Lady of Mystery (1913)

References and sources

1874 births
1949 deaths
20th-century Irish women writers